Conus alainallaryi is a species of sea snail, a marine gastropod mollusk in the family Conidae, the cone snails and their allies.

Like all species within the genus Conus, these snails are predatory and venomous. They are capable of "stinging" humans, therefore live ones should be handled carefully or not at all.

Description
The size of the shell varies between 30 mm and 42 mm.

Distribution
This species occurs in the caribbean Sea off Colombia.

References

 Bozzetti, L. and Monnier, E. 2009. Conus alainallaryi (Gastropoda: Prosobranchia: Conidae) a new species from Colombia. Malacologia Mostra Mondia 65:5–6
 Puillandre N., Duda T.F., Meyer C., Olivera B.M. & Bouchet P. (2015). One, four or 100 genera? A new classification of the cone snails. Journal of Molluscan Studies. 81: 1–23

External links
 The Conus Biodiversity website
 
 Holotype in MNHN, Paris

alainallaryi
Gastropods described in 2009